The UEFA qualifiers for the 2023 World Beach Games, known officially as the ANOC World Beach Games European Qualifier Catania 2022, was a beach soccer tournament contested by European national teams who are members of UEFA that took place to determine the nations from Europe that qualified to the beach soccer events at the second edition of the ANOC World Beach Games in Bali, Indonesia.

The tournament consisted of two events: the men's qualifiers and the women's qualifiers, both round robin and knockout competitions from which the top five teams qualified from the former and the top four teams qualified from the latter.

Organised by Beach Soccer Worldwide (BSWW), the competition took place in Catania, Italy from 29 August – 4 September 2022. The men's defending champions were Russia, but they were banned from entering the competition due to invasion of Ukraine; Spain won the men's title on this occasion. The women's defending champions were England, who successfully defended the title.

Venue
The matches took place at the Sicily Arena Beach Stadium on Playa di Catania (Catania Beach).

Men's tournament

Teams 
13 teams entered the men's event. The entrants are listed below, ordered by their European Ranking in parentheses:

Draw 
The draw to split the 13 teams into four groups – three of three teams and one of four – took place at 11:00 CEST (UTC+2) on 8 August 2022 at the headquarters of BSWW in Barcelona, Spain. Its procedure was as follows:

For the purpose of the draw, the 13 teams were split into four pots according to their world ranking – the hosts and three highest ranked teams were seeded and assigned to the heads of the groups; the next highest ranked teams were then placed in Pot 1, down to the lowest ranked team placed in Pot 3.

One team from Pot 1 and one team from Pot 2 were drawn into the four groups. The sole team in Pot 3 was drawn at random into one of the groups.

The composition of the pots is shown below:

Group stage
The group stage took place from 29–31 August.

Group A

Group B

Group C

Group D

Knockout stage

9th–12th place

1st–8th place
The quarter-finals winners, plus the winners of the fifth place match, qualify to the 2023 World Beach Games.

Awards

Winners trophy

Individual awards

Top goalscorers 
Players who scored at least four goals are listed.

Final standings 
 
Source: BSWW

Women's tournament

Teams 
Seven teams entered the women's event which are as follows, ordered by their European Ranking in parentheses:

Draw
The draw to split the seven teams into two groups – one of four teams and one of three – took place at 11:00 CEST (UTC+2) on 8 August 2022 at the headquarters of BSWW in Barcelona, Spain alongside the men's draw. Its procedure was as follows:

For the purpose of the draw, the seven teams were split into four pots according to their world ranking – the hosts and highest ranked team were seeded and assigned to the heads of the groups; the next highest ranked teams were then placed in Pot 1, down to the lowest ranked team placed in Pot 3.

One team from Pot 1 and one team from Pot 2 were drawn into the two groups. The sole team in Pot 3 was drawn at random into one of the groups.

The composition of the pots is shown below:

Group stage
The group stage took place from 31 August – 2 September.

The group winners and runners-up qualify to the 2023 World Beach Games.

Group A

Group B

Knockout stage

5th place

1st–4th place

Awards

Winners trophy

Individual awards

Top goalscorers 
Players who scored multiple goals are listed.

Final standings 
 
 
Source: BSWW 

a.

References

External links 
ANOC World Beach Games Qualifier Catania 2022, at Beach Soccer Worldwide
Women's ANOC World Beach Games Qualifier Catania 2022, at Beach Soccer Worldwide

 
World Beach Games 
2023 
2022 
August 2022 sports events in Italy
September 2022 sports events in Italy
Sports events affected by the 2022 Russian invasion of Ukraine